Yaro is a town in the Bagassi Department of Balé Province in southern Burkina Faso, in west Africa.

The town has a population of 1,573.

References

Populated places in the Boucle du Mouhoun Region
Balé Province